Ochyrotica rufa is a moth of the family Pterophoridae.

Distribution
It is known from Comoros, La Réunion, Madagascar and Mauritius.

Biology
A known host-plant of this species is Ipomoea batatas (Convolvulaceae).

References
 Arenberger, E. 1987. Ochyrotica rufa n. sp. aus Madagaskar. - Entomologische Zeitschrift 97:175–176

Ochyroticinae
Moths of Madagascar
Moths of Réunion
Moths of Mauritius
Moths described in 1987
Moths of the Comoros